The Jordan 193 was the car with which the Jordan team competed in the 1993 Formula One World Championship. The car was powered by a Hart 3.5-litre V10 engine and ran on Goodyear tyres. The number 14 seat was taken by debutant Rubens Barrichello, while five different drivers occupied the number 15 seat over the course of the season: Ivan Capelli, Thierry Boutsen, Marco Apicella, Emanuele Naspetti and Eddie Irvine.

Overview
After a disastrous  season with underpowered and unreliable Yamaha V12 engines, the team took the decision to replace these with Hart's smaller V10s for 1993.

The 193 differed greatly to its two predecessors, with a higher nose and very different front wing. Like most of the other cars that competed in the 1993 Championship, it had numerous electronic aids to assist the driver and improve the car's performance. Traction control was used throughout the season, as was the team's first semi-automatic gearbox. The gearbox caused numerous problems, as it often would jam in one gear. This occurred so much at the beginning of the season that the team replaced the semi automatic gearbox with a manual one until the semi was reliable enough to race. The car also lacked the active suspension used by the frontrunners and had too short a wheelbase, which caused instability in the rear for most of the year but was later lengthened in an attempt to find more speed. The net result was that the 193 was usually over three seconds per lap slower than the fastest cars, but was still a competent midfield runner.

No fewer than six drivers raced the car throughout the season, with only young rookie Rubens Barrichello competing in every race. Ivan Capelli, Thierry Boutsen, Marco Apicella, Emanuele Naspetti and Eddie Irvine all raced at some stage of the season. None of the drivers except Irvine were able to match Barrichello's pace. Boutsen, who drove the most races of the second drivers, was often around two seconds per lap slower than Barrichello.

Despite heavy revisions to the car throughout the year – such as improved aerodynamics, altered suspension, and more powerful engines – its relative performance stayed roughly the same. However, Barrichello was on course to finish third at the wet European Grand Prix, only to be denied by a fuel pressure problem in the closing laps. The team finally scored points at the Japanese Grand Prix, where Barrichello and debutant Irvine finished fifth and sixth respectively; Irvine made headlines at this race when he unlapped himself by passing leader and eventual winner Ayrton Senna, angering the triple World Champion so much that he punched Irvine after the race.

The team finished equal tenth in the Constructors' Championship with three points.

Complete Formula One results
(key)

References

1993 Formula One season cars
Jordan Formula One cars